The House That Screamed is a 2000 horror film by the Polonia brothers, released by Sub Rosa Studios.

The film follows a writer (Bob Dennis), attempting to escape from the recent tragedy in his life by throwing himself into his work, only to discover the haunted house.

It was followed by a sequel, Hellgate: the House That Screamed 2.

References

External links
 
 Review from Films On The Fringe

2000 films
2000 horror films
American horror films
Camcorder films
Films directed by Mark Polonia
2000s English-language films
2000s American films